Brigadier Archibald Robert Allen, ED (20 October 1888 – September 1961) was a senior Australian Army officer in the Second World War.
 
Allen is believed to have enlisted in the First World War on 16 September 1914 and was assigned to H Company in the 16th Battalion (according to the AIF Project website).

Between the wars Allen was the Commanding Officer 43rd/48th Infantry Battalion.

During the Second World War Allen was Commanding Officer of the 3rd Infantry Brigade (1936–1942), and Commandant of the Western Reinforcement Training Centre (1944). He retired in 1944.

References

1888 births
1961 deaths
Australian brigadiers
Australian military personnel of World War I
Australian Army personnel of World War II
British emigrants to Australia
People from Nunhead